The list of ship launches in 1988 includes a chronological list of all ships launched in 1988.


References

1988
Ship launches